Jules Ernest Gustaaf, Baron Krings (29 September 1920 – 1 July 2017) was a Belgian judge and legal scholar.

During his career he became procurator general at the Court of Cassation, a royal commissioner for the revision of the Judicial Code, and a professor of law at the Free University of Brussels. On 25 November 1993 he received a grant of hereditary nobility with the personal title of baron from Albert II of Belgium. Ernest Krings died on 1 July 2017 at the age of 96.

Honours 
 1993: Created Baron Krings by HM King Albert II, Munus et Fidelitas.
 Member of the Royal Academy of Science, Letters and Fine Arts of Belgium
 Member of the Royal Flemish Academy of Belgium for Science and the Arts
 Grand Cordon in the Order of Leopold.
 Knight Grand Cross in the Order of the Crown.
 Grand Officer in the Order of Leopold II.
 Grand Officer in the Order of Orange-Nassau.
 Grand Officer in the Order of the Oak Crown.

References

1920 births
2017 deaths
Members of the Royal Academy of Belgium
Members of the Royal Flemish Academy of Belgium for Science and the Arts
Barons of Belgium
Academic staff of the Free University of Brussels (1834–1969)
20th-century Belgian judges
Grand Crosses of the Order of the Crown (Belgium)
Grand Officers of the Order of Leopold II
Grand Officers of the Order of Orange-Nassau